Emmebi Motorsport was an auto racing team based in Italy.

References

External links

Italian auto racing teams
Formula Renault teams
Sports car racing teams
Auto GP teams

Auto racing teams established in 2000